Shane Buechele (born January 8, 1998) is an American football quarterback for the Kansas City Chiefs of the National Football League (NFL). He played college football at Texas before transferring to SMU.

Early years
Buechele attended Lamar High School in Arlington, Texas, where he was a star in both football and baseball. During his career as a quarterback, he passed for 6,379 yards with 73 touchdowns and rushed for 1,805 yards and 21 touchdowns. Buechele was ranked among the top quarterback recruits in his class and was invited to the Elite 11 quarterback competition where he impressed the coaches with his accuracy, eventually finishing second overall. Despite growing up in a pro-Oklahoma Sooner household, Buechele committed to rival Texas to play college football.

College career

Texas Longhorns
Buechele competed with Tyrone Swoopes for the Longhorns' starting quarterback job his freshman year in 2016. After winning the job, he started his first career game against 10th-ranked Notre Dame, making him only the second true freshman to ever start at QB for Texas and the first since Bobby Layne in 1944. Buechele led the unranked Longhorns to a 50–47 double overtime victory in what was the first-ever overtime game in Darrell K Royal–Texas Memorial Stadium. The game was widely regarded as an instant classic. Buechele finished with 280 yards on 16 for 26 passing for 2 touchdowns and one interception. In a week 10 battle against West Virginia, Buechele passed Colt McCoy for most passing yards by a freshman in school history. Buechele finished his freshman season with 2,958 passing yards, 21 passing touchdowns, and 11 interceptions.

Buechele started in Texas' first game of the 2017 season, a 51–41 loss to Maryland. In that game he set career highs for completions, attempts and yards. However, due to various injuries, he was replaced by backup quarterback Sam Ehlinger in subsequent games against San Jose State and USC. Buechele returned to lead Texas over Iowa State, but then injuries again sidelined him in losses in the next two games, against Kansas State and Oklahoma, though he did take the field briefly in the latter. He returned to start against Baylor, TCU and Kansas, losing only the TCU game. He then started the West Virginia game, but only played the first two series before being benched for Ehlinger. Buechele finished the season as Ehlinger's backup in games against Texas Tech and Missouri.

In 2018, Buechele saw action in only two games, therefore redshirting that season.  Against Baylor he replaced an injured Ehlinger after game officials made Ehlinger leave because his right (throwing) hand was bleeding. Ehlinger had an injured shoulder and never returned. Buechele led the Longhorns to a 23–17 victory. Against Iowa State, Ehlinger again injured his shoulder, this time in the second half. Buechele again replaced him in another Longhorn win. This time he merely needed to hold on to the lead, throwing 10 for 10 for 89 yards and a touchdown.

SMU Mustangs
Buechele transferred to Southern Methodist University after graduating from Texas in the spring, replacing Ben Hicks who transferred to the University of Arkansas. Buechele started for the Mustangs in their first game of the season at Arkansas State. He finished the game with 30 completions out of 49 attempts for 360 yards with one interception in the 37–30 victory.

Statistics

Professional career

After going undrafted in the 2021 NFL Draft, Buechele signed with the Kansas City Chiefs as an undrafted free agent on May 13, 2021. He was waived on August 31, 2021. The following day he was signed to their practice squad. He was elevated from the practice squad on November 16, 2021. In the 2022 NFL season, Buechele was a part of the Chiefs Super Bowl LVII victory after they defeated the Philadelphia Eagles.

Personal life
Buechele's father, Steve, played in Major League Baseball (MLB) from 1985 to 1995 and is currently a TV analyst for the  Texas Rangers.

References

External links
SMU Mustangs bio
Texas Longhorns bio

Living people
1998 births
Sportspeople from Arlington, Texas
Players of American football from Texas
American football quarterbacks
Texas Longhorns football players
SMU Mustangs football players
Kansas City Chiefs players